The 1971–72 daytime network television schedule for the three major English-language commercial broadcast networks in the United States covers the weekday and weekend daytime hours from September 1971 to August 1972.

Legend

 New series are highlighted in bold.

Schedule
 All times correspond to U.S. Eastern and Pacific Time scheduling (except for some live sports or events). Except where affiliates slot certain programs outside their network-dictated timeslots, subtract one hour for Central, Mountain, Alaska, and Hawaii-Aleutian times.
 Local schedules may differ, as affiliates have the option to pre-empt or delay network programs. Such scheduling may be limited to preemptions caused by local or national breaking news or weather coverage (which may force stations to tape delay certain programs to other timeslots) and any major sports events scheduled to air in a weekday timeslot (mainly during major holidays). Stations may air shows at other times at their preference.
ABC had a 6PM (ET)/5PM (CT) feed for their newscast, depending on stations' schedule

Monday-Friday

Saturday

In the News aired after all of CBS' Saturday morning shows except The Bugs Bunny Show, You Are There, and CBS Children's Film Festival.

Sunday

By network

ABC

Returning Series
ABC Evening News
All My Children
American Bandstand
Bewitched 
The Bullwinkle Show
The Dating Game
General Hospital
Here Come the Double Deckers 
Issues and Answers
Jonny Quest 
Lancelot Link, Secret Chimp 
Let's Make a Deal
Love, American Style 
The Newlywed Game
One Life to Live
Password
The Reluctant Dragon and Mr. Toad Show 
That Girl 
Will the Real Jerry Lewis Please Sit Down 

New Series
Curiosity Shop
The Funky Phantom
The Jackson 5ive
Lidsville
Make a Wish
The Road Runner Show
Split Second

Not Returning From 1970-71
A World Apart
Cattanooga Cats 
Dark Shadows
Discovery
The Hardy Boys 
Hot Wheels
The Motormouse & AutoCat Show
Skyhawks
The Smokey Bear Show

CBS

Returning Series
Archie's TV Funnies
As the World Turns
The Beverly Hillbillies 
The Bugs Bunny Show
Camera Three
Captain Kangaroo
CBS Evening News
CBS Morning News
The Edge of Night
Face the Nation
Family Affair 
Gomer Pyle, USMC 
Groovie Goolies 
The Guiding Light
Harlem Globetrotters
Josie and the Pussycats 
Lamp Unto My Feet
Look Up and Live
Love is a Many Splendored Thing
Love of Life
The Lucy Show 
The Monkees 
Sabrina the Teenage Witch 
Scooby-Doo, Where Are You! 
Search for Tomorrow
The Secret Storm
Sunrise Semester
Tom and Jerry 
Where the Heart Is

New Series
The Amateur's Guide to Love
CBS Children's Film Festival
Help!... It's the Hair Bear Bunch!
My Three Sons 
The Pebbles and Bamm-Bamm Show
You Are There

Not Returning From 1970-71
Dastardly and Muttley in their Flying Machines 
The Jetsons  (moved to NBC)
The Perils of Penelope Pitstop

NBC

Returning Series
Another World
Bright Promise
The Bugaloos
Concentration
Dinah's Place
Days of Our Lives
Doctor Dolittle 
The Doctors
The Hollywood Squares
Jeopardy!
Meet the Press
NBC Nightly News
NBC Saturday Night News
NBC Sunday Night News
The New Pink Panther Show
Sale of the Century
Somerset
Three on a Match
Today
The Who, What, or Where Game
The Woody Woodpecker Show 

New Series
Barrier Reef
Deputy Dawg 
The Jetsons 
Mr. Wizard
Return to Peyton Place
Take a Giant Step

Not Returning From 1970-71
The Heckle and Jeckle Cartoon Show
Here Comes the Grump 
Hot Dog
H.R. Pufnstuf 
Jambo
Joe Garagiola's Memory Game
The Tomfoolery Show
Words and Music

See also
1971-72 United States network television schedule (prime-time)
1971-72 United States network television schedule (late night)

Sources
Castleman & Podrazik, The TV Schedule Book, McGraw-Hill Paperbacks, 1984

United States weekday network television schedules
1971 in American television
1972 in American television